On February 19, 2022, a mass shooting occurred near Normandale Park, in Portland, Oregon, United States. One person was killed and five others were injured, including the shooter. The shooting took place near a demonstration for Amir Locke, a 22-year-old Black man who was shot and killed by a Minneapolis police officer and Patrick Kimmons, a 27-year-old Black man killed by Portland police during a 2018 altercation.

Benjamin J. Smith was arrested and charged with second-degree murder, four counts of attempted murder, and several assault charges in connection with the shooting. He pleaded guilty to all charges.

Shooting
The evening of Saturday, February 19, 2022, several traffic safety volunteers had gathered near the intersection of NE 55th and NE Hassalo, near the southwest corner of Normandale Park, for a “Justice for Amir Locke” protest, in reference to the Black man who had been killed weeks earlier in Minneapolis while police executed a no-knock warrant on an apartment. Several protests had been held in Portland in the weeks following Locke's death. The night of February 19, a few people were providing traffic safety by re-routing vehicular traffic to avoid a protest march.

Benjamin Smith confronted a group of unarmed female traffic safety volunteers and told them to leave. People attempted to de-escalate the situation, but he pulled a .45 caliber handgun and fired at close range into a crowd of safety volunteers and struck five. An armed bystander fired back and struck Smith near his hip.

Portland Police Bureau responded to the shooting and closed streets in the area.

The bystander who returned fire was initially arrested on assault and weapons charges, but the charges were dropped. Smith was hospitalized in serious condition and placed under arrest; he was formally charged and was booked into jail facility on March 23, 2022.

Victims 
Brandy "June" Knightly, a 60-year old woman, was pronounced dead at the scene of the shooting.  Four others were wounded by gunfire and transported to a hospital, with one being struck in the neck paralyzed from the neck down as a result. 

Knightly had been an activist with Portland's racial justice movements and was among of small group preparing to act as a traffic safety volunteer the night of the shooting. She was struck by a bullet in her head that was fired at close range. Knightly and others in the group that Smith initially approached were unarmed.

Perpetrator 
Benjamin J. Smith was a 43-year old machinist and Portland resident who rented an apartment near Normandale Park. He had expressed animosity towards Antifa and Black Lives Matter and had expressed support for Nazis, Proud Boys, and Kyle Rittenhouse, the person who was acquitted of criminal charges related to the Kenosha unrest shooting. In June 2022, the Federal Bureau of Investigation (FBI) confirmed it had flagged the Smith's behavior going back to 2006, and that the bureau had contacted him in 2021 about it. It was unclear if the FBI had ever warned local law enforcement, but the investigation was abandoned. He had also been convicted of criminal mischief and harassment in 2010. Smith had been reported to law enforcement several times in the years leading up to the shooting, including by a relative who called a non-emergency line in May 2021 to report a death threat he received from Smith via Facebook Messenger.

Investigation 
Initial reporting the Portland Police Bureau claimed the shooting began due to a confrontation between an armed homeowner and armed protestors, however, none of the victims were armed and the shooter had gone to the demonstration which was down the road from his rented apartment. The statement was later updated to call the shooter an "armed area resident" but critics and advocates claimed the previous statement was a pattern of city and law enforcement officials misrepresenting racial justice protestors and part of a long line of recent scandals. Teressa Raiford, executive director of Don’t Shoot Portland, said about the mischaracterization of the shooter by police, "I believe that it was [done] to entice vigilantism. I can’t think of anything else that could occur from that type of misreporting or misinformation.” Several local organizations called for an independent investigation into the city on the spread of misinformation in the aftermath of the shooting. 

Tension between demonstrators and officials persisted during the investigation. City leaders said they had difficulty obtaining information from witnesses, which some racial justice advocates said that was due to false characterizations about the demonstration and of fears of further violence or reprisal. Sandy Chung, executive director of the Oregon ACLU, noted the "context and environment of threats and doxing towards Black leaders and communities who are fighting for racial justice, but also the allies of this work." Chuck Lovell, the Portland police chief, said that shell casings, and possibly other evidence, was removed from the crime scene, which hampered the initial investigation. A police department spokesperson said that witness who may have recorded the incident on their mobile phones did not share it with police. Police investigators obtained GoPro video footage from a witness.

The Medical Examiner's office determined Knightly's death was a homicide due to a gunshot wound to the head. Police investigators declined to speculate on a motive in the days after the attack.

Legal proceedings 
On February 21, 2022, Mike Schmidt, the Multnomah County District Attorney, announced Smith would be charged with nine criminal counts related to the February 19, 2022 incident: one count of second-degree murder with a firearm, four counts of second-degree attempted murder with a firearm, two counts of first-degree assault with a firearm, and two counts of second-degree assault with a firearm.

The judicial case was presided over by Judge Christopher Marshall of Multnomah County Circuit Court. Smith was represented by a court-appointed attorney. A grand jury heard four days of testimony from 12 witness witnesses on February 28 and on March 4, 7, and 10 in 2022. The grand jury voted to indict Smith, the shooter, and on March 23, 2022, he was transferred from a hospital and booked into a jail facility, and the case information was available for public view.

In a court hearing on March 24, 2022, Smith pleaded not guilty to the charges. He was held in a Multnomah County jail facility without bail to await the criminal trial that was scheduled for April 2023.

In a court hearing on March 8, 2023, Smith pleaded guilty to second-degree murder, four counts of attempted murder, three counts of first-degree assault, and one count of second degree assault. Smith is scheduled to be sentenced on April 18, 2023. He faces a maximum sentence of life in prison.

Reaction 
The day after the shooting, Portland mayor Ted Wheeler issued a statement that included, "While many of the details of last night's shooting near Normandale Park are unclear, we do know one thing for sure: Our community is dealing with the sadness of another senseless act of gun violence."

Portland Commissioner Jo Ann Hardesty said in a statement on Twitter, "While we need more information about what transpired, I can say that protesting for racial justice should never endanger those exercising their 1st amendment rights."

Rallies to show solidarity with the victims of the shooting were held in Minneapolis and New York City on February 21, 2022. Activists held a memorial for Knightly at Normandale Park on February 22, 2022. Activists left tributes to her and set up a makeshift memorial and encampment at a pavilion in the park.

Many of the deceased victim’s friends and local advocates called the shooting "predictable" due to the history of far-right gathering and violent protests held in Portland in the past year. Some also highlighted the city’s history of White supremacy and race crimes.

The Legislative BIPOC Caucus of the Oregon Legislative Assembly said in a statement, “We cannot normalize violence towards our neighbors exercising their First Amendment right to peacefully gather. This weekend, we saw the fatal result of irresponsible rhetoric that villainizes those exercising the right to peaceful protest for racial justice."

See also
 George Floyd protests in Portland, Oregon

References

Further reading

 Doxsee, Catrina; Jones, Seth G.; Thompson, Jared; Halstead, Kateryna; Hwang, Grace (May 17, 2022). "Pushed to Extremes: Domestic Terrorism amid Polarization and Protest". CSIS Briefs. Center for Strategic and International Studies. Retrieved February 15, 2023.
 Evan, Roberts (September 5, 2022). "How Portland Stopped the Proud Boys". New Lines Magazine. Retrieved February 16, 2023.
 Yu, Kaila (February 23, 2022). "'He Slipped My Radar, and I’m F–ked Up About It': Furries Speak Out About Alleged Portland Shooter". Rolling Stone. Retrieved February 9, 2023.

External links 

 Multnomah County District Attorney

2022 in Portland, Oregon
2022 mass shootings in the United States
Black Lives Matter
February 2022 crimes in the United States
February 2022 events in the United States
Mass shootings in Oregon
Mass shootings in the United States